Matthew Willans (born 18 December 2000) is an Australian cricket player. He was born in Auchenflower in Queensland in 2000. Willans plays for the Queensland cricket team and the Australian national Under-19 team. as a left-arm pacer. In the Big Bash League, he plays for the Brisbane Heat. At , he is the tallest player in the league.

References 

2000 births
Living people
Australian cricketers